Football Manager 2011 (often abbreviated to FM11) is a football manager simulation video game. It was released for Microsoft Windows and Mac OS X on 5 November 2010. It was also released for PlayStation Portable on 26 November 2010. A version for iOS was released on 16 December 2010.

Gameplay 
FM11 features similar gameplay to previous entries in the Football Manager series. Gameplay consists of taking charge of a professional association football team, as the team manager. Players can sign football players to contracts, manage finances for the club, and give team talks to players. FM11 is a simulation of real world management, with the player being judged on various factors by the club's AI owners and board.

On 11 August 2010, Sports Interactive published a video announcing a number of new features that would be included in Football Manager 2011. FM11 features enhanced agent roles, with agents all acting differently according to their personalities. In-game press conferences received a revamp, with more in-depth questions being asked by the press.

FM11 also featured improvements to match analysis, with information regarding different plays being shown in-depth.

Reception

Review aggregator website Metacritic gives the game a score of 85/100, with "generally favorable reviews" based on 23 critic reports.

The German website 4players.de rated the game with 87% as "sehr gut".

Sales
In February 2011, Sega announced that FM11 was the company's third-highest-grossing game of the financial year, with the PC and PSP versions combined selling 690,000 units. Despite this, Sega called the game's sales "slow", alongside PlatinumGames' Vanquish and Sonic Colors.

References

External links 
 Official Football Manager 2011 Website

2010 video games
2011
Games for Windows certified games
IOS games
MacOS games
PlayStation Portable games
Video games developed in the United Kingdom
Windows games
La Liga licensed video games